Gheorghe Șoarece (5 December 1955 – 5 October 2009) was a Romanian professional footballer who played as a forward for teams such as FC Olt Scornicești, FCM Brașov and Inter Sibiu, among others.

Career
Born in Osica de Sus, Olt County, Șoarece started his football player career in 1969 at the local team, Oltețul Osica, then being transferred by Constantin Ștefan at IOB Balș, in 1972. From Balș, he moved to Dinamo Slatina, then, in 1975 signed a contract with FC Olt Scornicești, the team based in Nicolae Ceaușescu's hometown and a protégé of the communist regime. At FC Olt, Șoarece reached the peak of his career, being the goalscorer of the club in the second league, then promoting in the Divizia A, where he played in 112 matches and scored 24 goals, also being named as the captain of the squad from Olt County. In the Romanian first division he debuted in August 1979, in a game between FC Olt and Olimpia Satu Mare, ended with the score of 6–0.

A real star in Scornicești, Șoarece chose in 1983 to move at FCM Brașov, where he was wanted by Dumitru Dragomir, chairman of the club and also former president of FC Olt. With "the yellow and blacks" Gheorghe Șoarece achieved a promotion in the Divizia A, then played two years in the top-flight, before moving to Inter Sibiu, where he achieved another promotion in the first league, followed by two years of football at the highest level.

He retired in 1990 after some health problems, of respiratory nature. After retirement Șoarece moved back in Osica de Sus and was occasionally the manager of the local team, Oltețul, at amateur level.

Illness and death
Șoarece suffered of some respiratory problems since the end of his career as a footballer, fact that prompted him to withdraw from his activity. Although he suffered several neck surgery, the disease advanced in the later years and finally it brought him the end, at just 53 years old.

Honours
Olt Scornicești
Divizia B: 1978–79
Divizia C: 1977–78

Brașov
Divizia B: 1983–84

Inter Sibiu
Divizia B: 1987–88

References

1955 births
2009 deaths
People from Olt County
Romanian footballers
Association football forwards
Liga I players
Liga II players
FC Olt Scornicești players
FC Brașov (1936) players
Romanian football managers